Rachid Lousteque is a Moroccan football manager, who is currently manager of Somalia.

Managerial career
In December 2019, following the sacking of Rachid Taoussi, Lousteque was named as interim manager of Olympique de Khouribga after previously working as an assistant coach under Taoussi. On 5 July 2022, Lousteque was appointed as manager of Somalia.

References

Living people
Date of birth missing (living people)
Moroccan football managers
Olympique Club de Khouribga managers
Somalia national football team managers
Expatriate football managers in Somalia
Year of birth missing (living people)
Moroccan expatriate football managers
Moroccan expatriate sportspeople in Somalia
Botola managers
Association football coaches